MPCV may refer to:

 Multi-Purpose Crew Vehicle, a NASA spacecraft
 Mine Protected Combat Vehicle, an infantry fighting vehicle.